Welkin Capital Management is a growth equity firm that provides equity capital and strategic value to fast-growing companies in China. The firm was founded in 2009 by four Asian-based families and is led by Johnny S. Kong as Chairman and Chief Executive Officer.

Welkin Capital Management manages the proprietary capital of its founding families and has 29 employees and 15 investment professionals based in Hong Kong and Shanghai. The firm invests in growth-stage companies across all industries in China.

References

External links
Welkin Capital Management (company website)

Private equity firms of Hong Kong